Go Live from Paris is the second album by Go, recorded live in Paris at the Palais des Sports on 12 June 1976.

Track listing
All songs composed by Stomu Yamash'ta with lyrics by Michael Quartermain, except "Winner Loser" – lyrics by Steve Winwood.
"Space Song" – 2:30
"Carnival" – 1:12
"Wind Spin" – 9:30
"Ghost Machine" – 3:45
"Surf Spin" – 2:20
"Time is Here" – 9:20
"Winner Loser" – 5:10
"Solitude" – 2:00
"Nature" – 4:25
"Air Voice" – 1:19
"Crossing The Line" – 7:50
"Man of Leo" – 15:30
"Stellar" – 1:25
"Space Requiem" – 3:25

Personnel 
Stomu Yamashta – percussion and keyboards
Steve Winwood – vocals and piano
Michael Shrieve – drums
Klaus Schulze – synthesizers
Al Di Meola – lead guitar
Jerome Rimson – bass
Pat Thrall – guitar (solo on "Crossing The Line")
Brother James – congas
Karen Friedmann – vocals

References

External links

Go (band) albums
Klaus Schulze albums
1976 live albums
Island Records live albums